Mass is the main Eucharistic liturgical service in many forms of Western Christianity. The term Mass is commonly used in the Catholic Church, Western Rite Orthodoxy, Old Catholicism, and  Independent Catholicism. The term is used in some Lutheran churches, as well as in some Anglican churches. The term is also used, on rare occasion, by other Protestant churches.

Other Christian denominations may employ terms such as Divine Service or worship service (and often just "service"), rather than the word Mass. For the celebration of the Eucharist in Eastern Christianity, including Eastern Catholic Churches, other terms such as Divine Liturgy, Holy Qurbana, Holy Qurobo and Badarak (or Patarag) are typically used instead.

Etymology

The English noun Mass is derived from the Middle Latin . 'a sending, dismission').

The Latin term  itself was in use by the 6th century. It is most likely derived from the concluding formula  ("Go; the dismissal is made");  here is a Late Latin substantive corresponding to classical .

Historically, however, there have been other etymological explanations of the noun  that claim not to derive from the formula . Fortescue (1910) cites older, "fanciful" etymological explanations, notably a latinization of Hebrew  "unleavened bread; oblation", a derivation favoured in the 16th century by Reuchlin and Luther, or Greek  "initiation", or even Germanic  "assembly". The French historian Du Cange in 1678 reported "various opinions on the origin" of the noun  "Mass", including the derivation from Hebrew , here attributed to Caesar Baronius. The Hebrew derivation is learned speculation from 16th-century philology; medieval authorities did derive the noun  from the verb , but not in connection with the formula .
while Rupert of Deutz (early 12th century) derives it from a "dismissal" of the "enmities which had been between God and men".

Order of the Mass 

A distinction is made between texts that recur for every Mass celebration (ordinary), and texts that are sung depending on the occasion (proper).

Catholic Church 

The Catholic Church sees the Mass or Eucharist as "the source and summit of the Christian life", to which the other sacraments are oriented. Remembered in the Mass are Jesus' life, Last Supper, and sacrificial death on the cross at Calvary. The ordained celebrant (priest or bishop) is understood to act in persona Christi, as he recalls the words and gestures of Jesus Christ at the Last Supper and leads the congregation in praise of God. The Mass is composed of two parts, the Liturgy of the Word and the Liturgy of the Eucharist.

Although similar in outward appearance to the Anglican Mass or Lutheran Mass, the Catholic Church distinguishes between its own Mass and theirs on the basis of what it views as the validity of the orders of their clergy, and as a result, does not ordinarily permit intercommunion between members of these Churches. In a 1993 letter to Bishop Johannes Hanselmann of the Evangelical Lutheran Church in Bavaria, Cardinal Ratzinger (later Pope Benedict XVI) affirmed that "a theology oriented to the concept of succession [of bishops], such as that which holds in the Catholic and in the Orthodox church, need not in any way deny the salvation-granting presence of the Lord [Heilschaffende Gegenwart des Herrn] in a Lutheran [evangelische] Lord's Supper". The Decree on Ecumenism, produced by Vatican II in 1964, records that the Catholic Church notes its understanding that when other faith groups (such as Lutherans, Anglicans, and Presbyterians) "commemorate His death and resurrection in the Lord's Supper, they profess that it signifies life in communion with Christ and look forward to His coming in glory".

Within the fixed structure outlined below, which is specific to the Roman Rite, the Scripture readings, the antiphons sung or recited during the entrance procession or at Communion, and certain other prayers vary each day according to the liturgical calendar.

Introductory rites

The priest enters, with a deacon if there is one, and altar servers (who may act as crucifer, candle-bearers and thurifer). The priest makes the sign of the cross with the people and formally greets them. Of the options offered for the Introductory Rites, that preferred by liturgists would bridge the praise of the opening hymn with the Glory to God which follows. The Kyrie eleison here has from early times been an acclamation of God's mercy. The Penitential Act instituted by the Council of Trent is also still permitted here, with the caution that it should not turn the congregation in upon itself during these rites which are aimed at uniting those gathered as one praiseful congregation. The Introductory Rites are brought to a close by the Collect Prayer.

Liturgy of the Word
On Sundays and solemnities, three Scripture readings are given. On other days there are only two. If there are three readings, the first is from the Old Testament (a term wider than "Hebrew Scriptures", since it includes the Deuterocanonical Books), or the Acts of the Apostles during Eastertide. The first reading is followed by a psalm, recited or sung responsorially. The second reading is from the New Testament epistles, typically from one of the Pauline epistles. A Gospel acclamation is then sung as the Book of the Gospels is processed, sometimes with incense and candles, to the ambo; if not sung it may be omitted. The final reading and high point of the Liturgy of the Word is the proclamation of the Gospel by the deacon or priest. On all Sundays and Holy Days of Obligation, and preferably at all Masses, a homily or sermon that draws upon some aspect of the readings or the liturgy itself, is then given. The homily is preferably moral and hortatory. Finally, the Nicene Creed or, especially from Easter to Pentecost, the Apostles' Creed is professed on Sundays and solemnities, and the Universal Prayer or Prayer of the Faithful follows. The designation "of the faithful" comes from when catechumens did not remain for this prayer or for what follows.

Liturgy of the Eucharist

The Liturgy of the Eucharist begins with the preparation of the altar and gifts, while the collection may be taken. This concludes with the priest saying: "Pray, brethren, that my sacrifice and yours may be acceptable to God, the almighty Father." The congregation stands and responds: "May the Lord accept the sacrifice at your hands, for the praise and glory of His name, for our good, and the good of all His holy Church." The priest then pronounces the variable prayer over the gifts.

Then in dialogue with the faithful the priest brings to mind the meaning of "eucharist", to give thanks to God. A variable prayer of thanksgiving follows, concluding with the acclamation "Holy, Holy ....Heaven and earth are full of your glory. ...Blessed is he who comes in the name of the Lord. Hosanna in the highest." The anaphora, or more properly "Eucharistic Prayer", follows, The oldest of the anaphoras of the Roman Rite, fixed since the Council of Trent, is called the Roman Canon, with central elements dating to the fourth century. With the liturgical renewal following the Second Vatican Council, numerous other Eucharistic prayers have been composed, including four for children's Masses. Central to the Eucharist is the Institution Narrative, recalling the words and actions of Jesus at his Last Supper, which he told his disciples to do in remembrance of him. Then the congregation acclaims its belief in Christ's conquest over death, and their hope of eternal life. Since the early church an essential part of the Eucharistic prayer has been the epiclesis, the calling down of the Holy Spirit to sanctify our offering. The priest concludes with a doxology in praise of God's work, at which the people give their Amen to the whole Eucharistic prayer.

Communion rite

All together recite or sing the "Lord's Prayer" ("Pater Noster" or "Our Father"). The priest introduces it with a short phrase and follows it up with a prayer called the embolism, after which the people respond with another doxology. The sign of peace is exchanged and then the "Lamb of God" ("Agnus Dei" in Latin) litany is sung or recited while the priest breaks the host and places a piece in the main chalice; this is known as the rite of fraction and commingling.

The priest then displays the consecrated elements to the congregation, saying: "Behold the Lamb of God, behold him who takes away the sins of the world. Blessed are those called to the supper of the Lamb," to which all respond: "Lord, I am not worthy that you should enter under my roof, but only say the word and my soul shall be healed." Then Communion is given, often with lay ministers assisting with the consecrated wine. According to Catholic teaching, one should be in the state of grace, without mortal sin, to receive Communion. Singing by all the faithful during the Communion procession is encouraged "to express the communicants' union in spirit" from the bread that makes them one. A silent time for reflection follows, and then the variable concluding prayer of the Mass.

Concluding rite
The priest imparts a blessing over those present. The deacon or, in his absence, the priest himself then dismisses the people, choosing a formula by which the people are "sent forth" to spread the good news. The congregation responds: "Thanks be to God." A recessional hymn is sung by all, as the ministers process to the rear of the church.

Western Rite Orthodox Churches

Since most Eastern Orthodox Christians use the Byzantine Rite, most Eastern Orthodox Churches call their Eucharistic service "the Divine Liturgy." However, there are a number of parishes within the Eastern Orthodox Church which use an edited version of Latin liturgical rites. Most parishes use the "Divine Liturgy of St. Tikhon" which is a revision of the Anglican Book of Common Prayer, or "the Divine Liturgy of St. Gregory" which is derived from the Tridentine form of the Roman Rite Mass. These rubrics have been revised to reflect the doctrine and dogmas of the Eastern Orthodox Church. Therefore, the filioque clause has been removed, a fuller epiclesis has been added, and the use of leavened bread has been introduced.

Divine Liturgy of St. Gregory

 The Preparation for Mass
 Confiteor
 Kyrie Eleison
 Gloria in excelsis deo
 Collect of the Day
 Epistle
 Gradual
 Alleluia
 Gospel
 Sermon
 Nicene-Constantinopolitan Creed
 Offertory
 Dialogue
 Preface
 Sanctus
 Canon
 Lord's Prayer
 Fraction
 Agnus Dei
 Prayers before Communion
 Holy Communion
 Prayer of Thanksgiving
 Dismissal
 Blessing of the Faithful
 Last Gospel

Anglicanism

In the Anglican tradition, Mass is one of many terms for the Eucharist. More frequently, the term used is either Holy Communion, Holy Eucharist, or the Lord's Supper. Occasionally the term used in Eastern churches, the Divine Liturgy, is also used. In the English-speaking Anglican world, the term used often identifies the Eucharistic theology of the person using it. "Mass" is frequently used by Anglo-Catholics.

Structure of the rite
The various Eucharistic liturgies used by national churches of the Anglican Communion have continuously evolved from the 1549 and 1552 editions of the Book of Common Prayer, both of which owed their form and contents chiefly to the work of Thomas Cranmer, who in about 1547 had rejected the medieval theology of the Mass. Although the 1549 rite retained the traditional sequence of the Mass, its underlying theology was Cranmer's and the four-day debate in the House of Lords during December 1548 makes it clear that this had already moved far beyond traditional Catholicism. In the 1552 revision, this was made clear by the restructuring of the elements of the rite while retaining nearly all the language so that it became, in the words of an Anglo-Catholic liturgical historian (Arthur Couratin) "a series of communion devotions; disembarrassed of the Mass with which they were temporarily associated in 1548 and 1549". Some rites, such as the 1637 Scottish rite and the 1789 rite in the United States, went back to the 1549 model. From the time of the Elizabethan Settlement in 1559 the services allowed for a certain variety of theological interpretation. Today's rites generally follow the same general five-part shape. Some or all of the following elements may be altered, transposed or absent depending on the rite, the liturgical season and use of the province or national church:

 Gathering: Begins with a Trinitarian-based greeting or seasonal acclamation ("Blessed be God: Father, Son and Holy spirit. And Blessed be his kingdom, now and forever. Amen"). Then the Kyrie and a general confession and absolution follow. On Sundays outside Advent and Lent and on major festivals, the Gloria in Excelsis Deo is sung or said. The entrance rite then concludes with the collect of the day.
 Proclaiming and Hearing the Word: Usually two to three readings of Scripture, one of which is always from the Gospels, plus a psalm (or portion thereof) or canticle between the lessons. This is followed by a sermon or homily; the recitation of one of the Creeds, viz., the Apostles' or Nicene, is done on Sundays and feasts.
 The Prayers of the People: Quite varied in their form.
 The Peace: The people stand and greet one another and exchange signs of God's peace in the name of the Lord. It functions as a bridge between the prayers, lessons, sermon and creeds to the Communion part of the Eucharist.
The Celebration of the Eucharist: The gifts of bread and wine are brought up, along with other gifts (such as money or food for a food bank, etc.), and an offertory prayer is recited. Following this, a Eucharistic Prayer (called "The Great Thanksgiving") is offered. This prayer consists of a dialogue (the Sursum Corda), a preface, the sanctus and benedictus, the Words of Institution, the Anamnesis, an Epiclesis, a petition for salvation, and a Doxology. The Lord's Prayer precedes the fraction (the breaking of the bread), followed by the Prayer of Humble Access or the Agnus Dei and the distribution of the sacred elements (the bread and wine).
Dismissal: There is a post-Communion prayer, which is a general prayer of thanksgiving. The service concludes with a Trinitarian blessing and the dismissal.

The liturgy is divided into two main parts: The Liturgy of the Word (Gathering, Proclaiming and Hearing the Word, Prayers of the People) and the Liturgy of the Eucharist (together with the Dismissal), but the entire liturgy itself is also properly referred to as the Holy Eucharist. The sequence of the liturgy is almost identical to the Roman Rite, except the Confession of Sin ends the Liturgy of the Word in the Anglican rites in North America, while in the Roman Rite (when used) and in Anglican rites in many jurisdictions the Confession is near the beginning of the service.

Special Masses
The Anglican tradition includes separate rites for nuptial, funeral, and votive Masses. The Eucharist is an integral part of many other sacramental services, including ordination and Confirmation.

Ceremonial

Some Anglo-Catholic parishes use Anglican versions of the Tridentine Missal, such as the English Missal, The Anglican Missal, or the American Missal, for the celebration of Mass, all of which are intended primarily for the celebration of the Eucharist, or use the order for the Eucharist in Common Worship arranged according to the traditional structure, and often with interpolations from the Roman Rite. In the Episcopal Church (United States), a traditional-language, Anglo-Catholic adaptation of the 1979 Book of Common Prayer has been published (An Anglican Service Book).

All of these books contain such features as meditations for the presiding celebrant(s) during the liturgy, and other material such as the rite for the blessing of palms on Palm Sunday, propers for special feast days, and instructions for proper ceremonial order. These books are used as a more expansively Catholic context in which to celebrate the liturgical use found in the Book of Common Prayer and related liturgical books. In England supplementary liturgical texts for the proper celebration of Festivals, Feast days and the seasons is provided in Common Worship; Times and Seasons (2013), Festivals (Common Worship: Services and Prayers for the Church of England) (2008) and Common Worship: Holy Week and Easter (2011).

These are often supplemented in Anglo-Catholic parishes by books specifying ceremonial actions, such as A Priest's Handbook by Dennis G. Michno, Ceremonies of the Eucharist by Howard E. Galley, Low Mass Ceremonial by C. P. A. Burnett, and Ritual Notes by E.C.R. Lamburn. Other guides to ceremonial include the General Instruction of the Roman Missal, Ceremonies of the Modern Roman Rite (Peter Elliott), Ceremonies of the Roman Rite Described (Adrian Fortescue), and The Parson's Handbook (Percy Dearmer). In Evangelical Anglican parishes, the rubrics detailed in the Book of Common Prayer are sometimes considered normative.

Lutheranism

In the Book of Concord, Article XXIV ("Of the Mass") of the Augsburg Confession (1530) begins thus: Falsely are our churches accused of abolishing the Mass; for the Mass is retained among us, and celebrated with the highest reverence. We do not abolish the Mass but religiously keep and defend it. [...] We keep the traditional liturgical form. [...] In our churches Mass is celebrated every Sunday and on other holy days, when the sacrament is offered to those who wish for it after they have been examined and absolved (Article XXIV).

That verse contrasts the Old Testament priests, who needed to make a sacrifice for sins on a regular basis, with the single priest Christ, who offers his body only once as a sacrifice. Luther composed as a replacement a revised Latin-language rite, Formula missae, in 1523, and the vernacular Deutsche Messe in 1526.

As such, historically, the Lutheran Church has stated that the Lutheran Mass is "the only Mass founded in the Scriptures of God, in accordance with the plain and incontestable institution of the Saviour."

Scandinavian, Finnish, and some English speaking Lutherans, use the term "Mass" for their Eucharistic service, but in most German and English-speaking churches, the terms "Divine Service", "Holy Communion, or "the Holy Eucharist" are used.

Lutheran churches often celebrate the Eucharist each Sunday, if not at every worship service. This aligns with Luther's preference and the Lutheran confessions. Also, eucharistic ministers take the sacramental elements to the sick in hospitals and nursing homes. The practice of weekly Communion is increasingly the norm again in most Lutheran parishes throughout the world. The bishops and pastors of the larger Lutheran bodies have strongly encouraged this restoration of the weekly Mass.

Methodism

The celebration of the "Mass" in Methodist churches, commonly known as the Service of the Table, is based on The Sunday Service of 1784, a revision of the liturgy of the 1662 Book of Common Prayer authorized by John Wesley. The use of the term "Mass" is very rare in Methodism. The terms "Holy Communion", "Lord's Supper", and to a lesser extent "Eucharist" are far more typical.

The celebrant of a Methodist Eucharist must be an ordained or licensed minister. In the Free Methodist Church, the liturgy of the Eucharist, as provided in its Book of Discipline, is outlined as follows:
The Invitation: You who truly and earnestly repent of your sins, who live in love and peace with your neighbors and who intend to lead a new life, following the commandments of God and walking in His holy ways, draw near with faith, and take this holy sacrament to your comfort; and humbly kneeling, make your honest confession to Almighty God.
General Confession
Lord's Prayer
Affirmation of Faith
Collect
Sanctus
Gloria Patri
Prayer of Humble Access
Prayer of Consecration of the Elements
Benediction
Methodist services of worship, post-1992, reflect the ecumenical movement and Liturgical Movement, particularly the Methodist Mass, largely the work of theologian Donald C. Lacy.

Calendrical usage 

The English suffix  (equivalent to modern English "Mass") can label certain prominent (originally religious) feasts or seasons based on a traditional liturgical year. For example:
 	
 Candlemas
 Childermas
 Christmas

 Johnmas
 Lammas

 Martinmas
 Michelmas

See also

Black Mass
Blue Mass
Chantry
Eucharistic theologies contrasted
Gnostic Mass
Gold Mass
Liturgical reforms of Pope Pius XII
Mass (music)
 Mass in the Catholic Church
Mass of Paul VI
Pontifical High Mass
Red Mass
Redemptionis Sacramentum
Requiem Mass
Roman Missal
Sacraments of the Catholic Church
White Mass

Notes

References

Sources 
  (GIRM)

Further reading
Balzaretti, C., (2000). Missa: storia di una secolare ricerca etimologica ancora aperta. Edizioni Liturgiche
Baldovin, SJ, John F., (2008). Reforming the Liturgy: A Response to the Critics. The Liturgical Press.

Bugnini, Annibale (Archbishop), (1990). The Reform of the Liturgy 1948–1975. The Liturgical Press.
Donghi, Antonio, (2009). Words and Gestures in the Liturgy. The Liturgical Press.
Foley, Edward. From Age to Age: How Christians Have Celebrated the Eucharist, Revised and Expanded Edition. The Liturgical Press.

Johnson, Lawrence J., (2009). Worship in the Early Church: An Anthology of Historical Sources. The Liturgical Press.
Jungmann, Josef Andreas, (1948). Missarum Sollemnia. A genetic explanation of the Roman Mass (2 volumes). Herder, Vienna. First edition, 1948; 2nd Edition, 1949, 5th edition, Herder, Vienna-Freiburg-Basel, and Nova & Vetera, Bonn, 1962, .
Marini, Piero (Archbishop), (2007). A Challenging Reform: Realizing the Vision of the Liturgical Renewal. The Liturgical Press.
Martimort, A.G. (editor). The Church At Prayer. The Liturgical Press.

Stuckwisch, Richard, (2011). Philip Melanchthon and the Lutheran Confession of Eucharistic Sacrifice. Repristination Press.

External links

Present form of the Roman Rite
The Order of Mass
Fr. Larry Fama's Instructional Mass 
Today's Mass readings (New American Bible version)
The Readings of the Mass (Jerusalem Bible version)
Mass Readings (text in official Lectionary for Ireland, Australia, Britain, New Zealand etc.)

Tridentine Mass
Text of the Tridentine Mass in Latin and English

Anglicanism
The Anglican Missal online
The Book of Common Prayer (1662) and Common Worship (2002)

Lutheran doctrine
 The Church of Sweden Service Book including the orders for High and Low Mass

 
Eucharist
Catholic liturgical rites
 Mass
Sacraments
Anglican sacraments
Anglican Eucharistic theology
Lutheran Eucharistic theology
Christian terminology
Mass